The fourth-generation Honda Civic is an automobile produced by Honda from 1987 until 1991 with the wagon continuing in production in some markets until 1996.  The suspension had a new double-wishbone suspension in the front and an independent suspension in the rear, the wheelbase was increased to 98.4 inches (250 cm), and the body was redesigned with a lower hood line and more glass, giving less drag.  The redesigned Civic was introduced in 1987 for the 1988 model year.  The fourth-generation Civic would be available in three variants; 3-door hatchback, 4-door sedan and 5-door wagon with various trim levels offered in each variant.

Japanese market

This engine was also available in the commercial version of the Shuttle, sold as the "Honda Pro" initially.

The 1.5 L SOHC engine came in a variety of models, dual-point injection, single carbureted and dual carbureted. Those engines were available in the Japanese-market 25X and 25XT. The Si model featured a 1.6L DOHC 16-valve 4-cylinder (ZC) D16A8/A9 engine that produced .

In late 1989, a new trim package was added called the SiR which came equipped with a 1.6-litre DOHC VTEC 16-valve 4-cylinder B16A engine producing  at 7,600 rpm. This first B series engine, marked the introduction of Honda's variable valve timing and electronic lift control technology (VTEC). By providing two different camshaft profiles—one for fuel economy, one for performance, the VTEC engines set a high-revving, naturally aspirated precedent for future performance variants of the Honda Civic.  The European model, badged as a "1.6i-VT", used a slightly less powerful B16A1 engine, which had an 8,200 rpm redline and made , although it made the same  of torque as the Japanese market B16. In Japan, automatic-equipped SiR Civics also received the lower-powered engine. The SiR was available only as a hatchback, with a distinct updated look. Among the visual changes, the SiR had a very distinct front end. It's easily identifiable by the hood with a raised, rather than lowered center, and turn signals that wrap around the front bumper.

The wagon, known in Japan as the Civic Shuttle, continued to be built until 1996. The commercial-use model was called the "Honda Pro"; it was replaced by a dedicated commercial delivery van called the Honda Partner starting with model year 1996.

North American market

The fourth-generation Civic was introduced for the 1988 model year.  Unlike Civics sold in other markets, all North American Civics were fuel injected.  The fourth generation Civic offered larger dimensions than the previous Civic.  Initially, the Si model was not available.  All fourth-generation Civics have true all independent suspension and power steering is standard on all LX sedans and 4WD wagons and included on some other models when equipped with an automatic transmission.  Few changes were introduced in 1989 with the exception of the return of the Si model.

In 1990, the Civic received a minor refresh which included a redesigned front bumper, a revised shaped gauge cluster, updated tail lights and thinner side moldings. Civic sedans and wagons received automatic seat belts as well. The sedan and wagon featured powered automatic shoulder belts that retracted from the B-pillar to a position halfway down the A-pillar when the door was open, while the hatchback received a standard style shoulder and lap belt mechanism that was attached to the door and was intended to remain buckled at all times. While this setup did satisfy the federal regulations, the front doors had to be opened very wide to allow access between the belt and the seat. Many Civic owners used the door mounted belts just as they would pillar mounted belts, buckling and unbuckling as necessary. The Canadian models continued to use manual front seat belts.

Only minor changes were introduced in 1991 such as full wheel covers and body-colored bumpers on the DX hatchbacks and the Si side mirrors were now body-colored (instead of black).  1991 would be the final year for the fourth generation Civic.

3-door hatchback

CX/STD 
Known as the CX in Canada, the base model, only available as a hatchback, came equipped with minimal standard equipment. It came with a 1.5-liter SOHC 16-valve 4-cylinder D15B1 engine, producing . The standard equipped transmission was a 4-speed manual while a 4-speed automatic transmission was optional. The CX came without a rear wiper, black front and rear bumpers, less interior pieces, and a black rear centerpiece between the taillights.

DX 
The DX was available as either a sedan or hatchback. The DX sedan was the base model sedan.  The DX sedan came with plain black bumper covers while DX hatchbacks had matching body-colored bumper covers. Seats were cloth in all DX Civics. All DX Civics featured a 1.5-liter SOHC 16-valve 4-cylinder D15B2 engine producing  and came standard with a 5-speed manual transmission. A 4-speed automatic was optional.

LX 
Available only as a sedan, this had a higher level interior with tachometer instrumentation, electric windows and door locks, electric door mirrors, cruise control (beginning in 1990), clock and wheel covers as standard equipment as well as body-colored bumpers.  Like the DX model, the LX Civic was equipped with a 1.5 liter SOHC 16-valve 4-cylinder D15B2 engine producing  with a 5-speed transmission. A 4-speed automatic transmission was optional.

EX 
Available only as a sedan beginning in 1990, the EX is the premium sedan with all LX standard features but had the more powerful 1.6-liter SOHC 16-valve 4-cylinder D16A6 engine making  and 100 ft-lbs.  It also featured an upgraded interior and 175/65/HR14 tires as well as upgraded front brakes with 10.3-inch disc brakes vs. the 9.5-inch on the STD, DX, LX and Si models.

Si 
The Civic Si hatchback returned for the 1989 model year. The Si was only available as a hatchback with a 5-speed manual transmission, which featured shorter gears than lower models. The Si came with a 1.6-liter SOHC 16-valve 4-cylinder D16A6 engine producing .

The Si model adds features such as a power sunroof/moonroof, tachometer, dual manual side mirrors, an upgraded interior, color matched bumpers, dash clock, larger exhaust, front and rear anti-roll bars and 14-inch steel wheels with covers mounted with 185/60/R14 tires. There was no power steering and no automatic transmission available (except in Canada). Additional dealer-installed options were air conditioning and fog lights as well as other Honda accessories such as wheels, nose masks and audio components.

Wagon 
The wagon was available as FWD or RealTime4WD.  The 4WD wagon featured the same engine found in the Si hatchback; a 1.6 liter SOHC 16-valve 4-cylinder D16A6 engine producing  paired with either a 6-speed manual transmission (with a super-low gear left of first) or a 4-speed automatic transmission.  The FWD versions include a 1.5 liter SOHC 16-valve 4-cylinder D15B2 engine producing  paired with a 5-speed manual or 4-speed automatic transmission.  4WD wagons had white steel wheels with matching center caps. This body style remained in production until February 21, 1996, when it was replaced by the Honda Orthia and professional use Honda Partner, sold only in Japan.

North American curb weights 

Air Conditioning added .  Cargo capacity was an additional  hatchback,  sedan.

European market
For most of Europe, the base model came equipped with the 1.3 L engine. Next was a 1.4 L SOHC 4-cylinder dual carbureted engine that was available from 1988 until 1991, followed by the fuel injected 1.5i GL and GLX models.

In Europe, the SiR was called 1.6i-VT and had a similar 1.6-liter DOHC VTEC (B16A1) 4-cylinder engine.

South African market
In South Africa, the fourth generation Civic was sold under the Honda Ballade branding.

Awards
The fourth-generation Honda Civic was included in Car and Driver's 10Best for all four years (1988-1991).

The car was well-received globally, receiving “Golden Steering Wheel Award” from the German newspaper Bild am Sonntag, and ranking first in France’s l’Automobile magazine 1989 survey on car quality and reliability.

Motorsports

Despite its image as an economical vehicle, the fourth-generation hatchback became popular in near stock SCCA autocross competition. The ED chassis dominated the Street touring category, competing against the Mazda MX-5 Miata. Fourth-generation Civic hatchbacks became popular among Honda Civic enthusiasts due to their lightweight design and formidable suspension layout..

Due to the difference in engine output and modification potential between the American and JDM models, the fourth-generation Civic Si sparked a popular trend of engine swapping, where tuners would replace the D-series power plant with a more powerful B-series motor.

References and notes

External links
Civic4G.com

04
Cars introduced in 1987  
1990s cars
Cars discontinued in 1996